Lincoln Lawyer may refer to:

The Lincoln Lawyer, 2005 novel by American crime writer Michael Connelly
The Lincoln Lawyer (film), 2011 American mystery suspense thriller film adapted from the above novel
The Lincoln Lawyer (TV series), an American legal drama streaming television series
Lincoln the Lawyer, American statue in Illinois city of Urbana

See also
Lincoln (disambiguation)